The Dukes of Hazzard is a 2005 American action comedy road film loosely based on the television series of the same name. The film was directed by Jay Chandrasekhar and released on August 5, 2005, by Warner Bros. Pictures. As in the television series, the film depicts the adventures of cousins Bo, Luke, and Daisy, and their Uncle Jesse, as they outfox crooked Hazzard County Commissioner Boss Hogg and Sheriff Rosco P. Coltrane.

The film was the acting debut of pop singer Jessica Simpson. While financially successful with an opening debut of 30 million and a worldwide gross of $109.8 million, the film met with generally negative reviews from critics. The film was followed by a direct-to-video prequel titled The Dukes of Hazzard: The Beginning (2007).

Plot
Cousins Bo, Luke, and Daisy Duke run a moonshine business for their Uncle Jesse in Hazzard County, Georgia. The cousins' primary mode of transportation is an orange 1969 Dodge Charger that the boys affectionately refer to as the "General Lee". Along the way, the family is tormented by corrupt Hazzard County Commissioner Jefferson Davis Hogg, widely known as "Boss Hogg", and his willing but dimwitted henchman, Sheriff Rosco P. Coltrane.

After Rosco has the General Lee vandalized after Bo and Luke's attempt to run away from a daughter of one of their many moonshine customers, Billy Prickett, a famous stock-car driver, enters Hazzard to participate in the rally. Meanwhile, Rosco plants a fake moonshine still ("'cause he's too dumb to find the real one") in Uncle Jesse's barn and seizes the Duke property in the interest of eminent domain for Boss Hogg, forcing the family to temporarily reside with neighbor and Uncle Jesse's love-interest, Pauline. Pauline informs the Dukes that Rosco seized another farm on charges, so Bo and Luke investigate a local construction site and find their farm and neighboring farms marked on a map. They also discover a safe which they believe contains information that Boss Hogg wants to keep secret, unable to get the safe open they drag it behind Cooter's truck to Sheev's. 

With Sheev's help they blow open the safe and discover geologic core samples but are unsure on what the samples are. Meanwhile, at the local auto body shop run by the Dukes' friend Cooter Davenport has made a start on repairing the General Lee after it was damaged. Rosco then arrives and informs Cooter that he intends to seize the General Lee as "evidence", hearing this instead of just repairing the damage Rosco inflicted to the car earlier, with help turns the General Lee into a hot rod and applies a new horn, new paint job (including the Confederate flag and General Lee lettering on the roof) aswell as welding the doors shut (unable to fix them), in return for finally receiving payment for all the work he has done ("...'cause that's how this works...") for the boys in the past.

Rosco arrives before Bo and Luke can leave but the pair escape straight after Rosco opens the gates to the yard, they attempt to chase after Bo and Luke, but thanks to the help of Cooter, are left with flat tires preventing them from chasing after the General Lee. The Dukes go to Atlanta to visit a local university geology lab, meeting with Katie-Lynn Johnson, a Hazzard county girl and the Duke boys' love interest, and her Australian roommate Annette. At the lab, pretending to be scientists they discover Boss Hogg's intentions of turning the county into a strip coal mine. They inform Uncle Jesse about what Boss Hogg plans to do to Hazzard County and he tells them to get back to Hazzard County as fast as possible. While stopped at a set of lights however they get ambushed by a group of black gangsters who threaten them for pretending to be black (Bo and Luke's faces were covered in soot from a machine in the lab), before a fight can break out all of them except Katie and Annette are arrested by Atlanta Police Department (the pair had earlier run from campus police after under speeding). 

Back in Hazzard, Daisy learns, with the help of Sheriff's Deputy Enos Strate, that Boss Hogg has hired Billy Prickett to participate in the rally as a ringer. Boss Hogg then heads to Atlanta, where he informs the Duke boys, in lock-up, that they are too late to stop him and reveals that the vote on Hogg's proposition is at the same time as the rally, explaining Billy Prickett's involvement. During a transfer from detainment, Daisy helps the boys escape from the patrol car, and they speed home to try to inform the townsfolk, escaping the Atlanta Police, and the Georgia State Patrol after Bo outmaneuvers the city cops (who's furious at Luke after finding out that he and Katie-Lynn snuck up into the Dukes’ hayloft without him knowing about it).

Upon returning home, the Dukes discover that Boss Hogg and Rosco had taken Uncle Jesse and Pauline hostage, an obvious trap for the boys and that Billy is in on the scheme because he is ashamed of the town's low status. The two race to the farmhouse to cause a distraction to the waiting Hazzard County Sheriff's deputies and Georgia State Troopers, while Daisy and Cooter rescue Jesse and Pauline. Meanwhile, the college girls head to the rally with Sheev to inform the townsfolk about the vote on the strip-mining ordinance. Because of Sheev's armadillo hat and lack of pants, no one listens to him, so Bo leaves for the rally while Luke and Jesse team up to foil the county and state police who are chasing Bo, interfering with the race. Upon crossing the finish line first before Billy, the two then continue racing across town, leading the townsfolk to the courthouse. 

Meanwhile, other Hazzard County Sheriff's deputies and Georgia State Troopers had placed a roadblock before the courthouse. After Daisy failed to get help claiming that her car had broken down thanks to a female officer seeing through her ruse, using Cooter's tow truck as a ramp, Bo jumps over the roadblock. Luke, having stolen Boss Hogg's car, smashes through the roadblock, allowing the townsfolk to arrive just in time to vote against Boss Hogg's proposed ordinance. At the courthouse, Boss Hogg attempt's to have the boys locked up but Daisy takes advantage of the governor of Georgia's presence and TV cameras to convince him to pardoning the boys, so Uncle Jesse takes the opportunity to knock out Boss Hogg and gets a pardon for assaulting a county commissioner at the same time.

The final scene shows a cook-out at the Dukes' house where Pauline convinces Uncle Jesse, who could not be found because he was "using the meat smoker", to get up and play the television series' main theme. Bo and Luke are romantically involved with the girls in the General Lee (Luke with Katie & Bo with Annette) when Luke's other love-interest catches them Laurie Pullman from the introduction of the film who points a shotgun at them, realising she is about to fire after cocking the gun Luke shouts Go Bo Go with Bo responding Luke You Manwhore. Laurie proceeds to chase them with the shotgun as they drive away.

Cast

 Johnny Knoxville as Luke Duke
 Seann William Scott as Bo Duke
 Jessica Simpson as Daisy Duke
 Burt Reynolds as Boss Hogg
 Willie Nelson as Uncle Jesse Duke
 David Koechner as Cooter Davenport
 M. C. Gainey as Sheriff Rosco P. Coltrane
 Michael Weston as Deputy Enos Strate
 Lynda Carter as Pauline Powers
 James Roday Rodriguez as Billy Prickett
 Kevin Heffernan as Derek "Sheev" Sheevington
 Nikki Griffin as Katie-Lynn Johnson
 Jacqui Maxwell as Annette
 Alice Greczyn as Laurie Pullman
 Junior Brown as The Balladeer (narrator)
 Joe Don Baker as Governor Jim Applewhite
 Barry Corbin as Bill Pullman
 Andrew Prine as Angry Man
 Brendan Schetter as RandomStoner
Michael Roof as Dil Driscoll

Cameos
All five members of the comedy film troupe Broken Lizard make cameo appearances in the film, except for Kevin Heffernan, who had a larger speaking role (Sheev).
Broken Lizard cameos
 Steve Lemme appears as Jimmy Pullman, the son of Bill Pullman, in an early car chase scene in which he accidentally shoots the inside of his father's truck.
 Jay Chandrasekhar and Erik Stolhanske reprise their roles as Ramathorn and Rabbit from the Broken Lizard comedy, Super Troopers. The characters are now campus police officers, who warn the Duke boys for driving too slowly.
 Paul Soter appears as TV newsman Rick Shakely, who is reporting from the Hazzard Road Rally.
 Charlie Finn, who played a dimwitted fast-food employee in Super Troopers, appears as Royce Wilson, a dimwitted geology student who assists the Duke boys with the coal samples.

Other notable cameos
 During the bar-fight scene, Indy-car driver A. J. Foyt IV appears as himself.
 Bloopers roll under the ending credits, one of which features Rip Taylor interrupting the bedroom scene with Luke and the two college girls. Taylor had previously appeared with Knoxville in Jackass: The Movie.

Note
Tom Wopat, John Schneider, Catherine Bach, Byron Cherry and Christopher Mayer - who starred together in the TV series - were offered walk-on roles in the movie. All had passed, because they hated the script.

Production

Stunts
Knoxville said he was initially reluctant to take on the role, but was persuaded by script changes and the presence of Dan Bradley as stunt coordinator and second unit for the car chase scenes. Knoxville praised him, saying, "everyone in Hollywood wants Dan Bradley to shoot their car stuff".

Locations
Principal photography for the film began on November 15, 2004, before wrapping up the following February. The majority of the film was shot in and around Clinton & French Settlement, Louisiana. The Boar's nest was Moonlight Inn located in French Settlement, LA. The street scenes are set in Atlanta, but filmed in the New Orleans Central Business District, and the university scenes were shot on the campus of Louisiana State University.

Reception

Box office
The film was number one at the box office its opening weekend and grossed $30.7 million on 3,785 screens. It also had an adjusted-dollar rank of number 24 all-time for August releases. The film eventually collected $109.8 million worldwide, although it was much less successful financially outside the United States.

Critical reception
On Rotten Tomatoes, 14% of 168 reviews were positive. The website's consensus called the film "A dumb, goofy, and vacuous adaptation of a TV show where plot is simply an excuse to string together the car chases." On Metacritic the film has a weighted average score of 33% based on 36 reviews, indicating "Generally unfavorable reviews."  Audiences polled by CinemaScore gave the film a grade "B+" on scale of A to F. Longtime fans of the original Dukes of Hazzard series were generally disappointed by the film.

Roger Ebert gave the film one star, calling it a "lame-brained, outdated wheeze" and wondered if Burt Reynolds' part in the film is "karma-wise... the second half of what Smokey and the Bandit was the first half of". Ebert also named it the second-worst film of the year and Richard Roeper named it the worst film of 2005. Ebert also included the film on his most hated list.

Owen Gleiberman of Entertainment Weekly gave it B+ grade and wrote: "It's trash, all right, but perfectly skewed trash -- a comedy that knows just how smart to be about just how dumb it is."

Awards

At the 26th Golden Raspberry Awards, the film received seven nominations, but did not win any.
 Worst Picture - lost to Dirty Love
 Worst Director (Jay Chandrasekhar) - lost to John Mallory Asher for Dirty Love
 Worst Screenplay (John O'Brien) - lost to Jenny McCarthy for Dirty Love
 Worst Supporting Actor (Burt Reynolds) - lost to Hayden Christensen in Star Wars: Episode III – Revenge of the Sith
 Worst Supporting Actress (Jessica Simpson) - lost to Paris Hilton in House of Wax
 Worst Screen Couple (Jessica Simpson and her Daisy Dukes) - lost to Nicole Kidman and Will Ferrell in Bewitched
 Worst Remake or Sequel - lost to Son of the Mask

At the People's Choice Awards, Simpson won the "Favorite Song from a Movie" award for her cover of Nancy Sinatra's "These Boots Are Made for Walkin'".

The film was nominated for two MTV Movie Awards, including Best On-Screen Team (Johnny Knoxville, Seann William Scott, and Jessica Simpson), and Sexiest Performance (Jessica Simpson).

Simpson won the Choice Breakout Female award for her role in the film at the Teen Choice Awards.

Controversies
Before the release of this film, Warner Bros. reportedly paid $17.5 million to the producer of Moonrunners, the movie that inspired the television series. This was soon followed by a claim from screenwriter Gy Waldron. The Hollywood Reporter reported that James Best, who portrayed Rosco P. Coltrane in the original series, filed suit in late July 2011 over royalties he was contracted to receive over spinoffs that "used his identity". 

Ben Jones, who played Cooter Davenport in the original series, criticized the film for its emphasis on sexual content, suggesting that the original series was more family-oriented and not as sexualized. He called for fans of the television series to boycott the film "unless they clean it up before the August 5th release date."

Some have countered that the original series also contained sexual themes, primarily Catherine Bach's (Daisy Duke) much-displayed "short shorts" (which have become so ubiquitous in American culture that skimpy blue jean cutoff shorts are now often simply called "Daisy Dukes"). In a film review, a New York Daily News entertainment columnist said the movie's sex humor is "cruder" than the TV series, but that it is "nearly identical to the TV series in... its ogling of the posterior of cousin Daisy Duke."

Although initially he commented that he enjoyed the new style of relationship between the movie versions of Bo and Luke, John Schneider, who played Bo Duke in the original series, was later asked if he saw the film and said: "My gosh... it was terrible! It wasn't Dukes. It was true to whatever it was; I just don't know what that was!"

John Schneider has said  that when he arrived at the premiere, Johnny Knoxville came up to him and apologised for how bad the film was. Schneider has also questioned why TV channels show the film but are not prepared to rerun the original series.

Differences from source material

 In the series, Bo and Luke Duke were on probation, and Jesse had quit moonshining to keep them out of prison. A frequent obstacle as the result of their probation was their inability to leave Hazzard County without the consent of Boss Hogg. In the film, the Dukes are still actively producing and distributing moonshine, and Bo and Luke freely travel to Atlanta.
 Boss Hogg and Sheriff Rosco P. Coltrane are portrayed as far more serious and sinister than their TV counterparts. In the series, Hogg was very opposed to violence and would often abandon schemes if any characters were put in harm's way. In the film, Hogg has Jesse and Pauline (an original character) held hostage in one scene, and pays for an annoying prisoner to be knocked unconscious in another.
 When the series portrayed the origins of the General Lee, the car immediately showcased its iconic design. In the opening of the film, the design of the General is rather different, with a crudely-styled 01 on the doors and missing the Confederate flag and name above the windows. When Cooter restores the General after it is vandalized by Boss Hogg's associates, the classic design is applied.
 In most of the series, the Hazzard County Police Department is limited to Sheriff Coltrane and one deputy. (Enos or Cletus) In the film, the police department seems to be rather extensive for a small town.
 In the series, Luke was a former Sergeant of the U.S. Marine Corps. This is not mentioned in the film. Contrarily, in the film, Jesse is introduced as a Korean War veteran, though the series did not portray him as a veteran.

Soundtrack

Jessica Simpson recorded her own version of "These Boots Are Made for Walkin'" (and added her own lyrics) for the soundtrack to the film. Performed from the point of view of her character in the movie, Simpson's cover was co-produced by Jimmy Jam and Terry Lewis, and was released as the soundtrack's first single in 2005. It became Simpson's fifth top-20 single in the United States and its music video drew some controversy because of its sexual imagery. Both the original Ram Jam version of "Black Betty", and the Sylvia Massy produced remake by Spiderbait appear in the film. AC/DC's "If You Want Blood (You've Got It)" and "Shoot to Thrill" are also played.

Unrated cut
An unrated cut restored changes made to get a PG-13 rating from the Motion Picture Association of America. The unrated cut was released on DVD, and included rated and unrated bonus features, including unrated deleted scenes and blooper scenes. This edition was not rated by the MPAA, and contained additional nudity, language, and violent driving stunts.

Prequel
A prequel to the film, titled The Dukes of Hazzard: The Beginning, was released to television on March 4, 2007, and released to DVD on March 13, 2007.

References

External links

 
 
 
 The Dukes of Hazzard at HazzardNet.com

The Dukes of Hazzard films
2000s adventure comedy films
2000s buddy comedy films
2000s road movies
2005 action comedy films
2005 films
American action comedy films
American adventure comedy films
American auto racing films
American buddy comedy films
American comedy road movies
Films based on adaptations
Films based on television series
Films directed by Jay Chandrasekhar
Films scored by Nathan Barr
Films set in Georgia (U.S. state)
Films shot in Louisiana
Films shot in New Orleans
Village Roadshow Pictures films
Warner Bros. films
2000s English-language films
2000s American films